Sermyla is a monotypic moth genus in the subfamily Arctiinae. Its only species, Sermyla transversa, is found in Brazil. Both the genus and species were first described by Francis Walker in 1854.

References

External links

Moths described in 1854
Arctiinae
Monotypic moth genera